Hopa is a city and a district in the Artvin Province of Turkey.

Hopa may also refer to:

 Hopa River, main water stream of Hopa in the eastern Black Sea Region of Turkey
 Housing for Older Persons Act, known as HOPA, an amendment to the U.S. Fair Housing Act
 Malus hopa, a type of Crabapple tree
 HOPA or hidden object puzzle adventure, a variety of hidden object game
 Opa (Greek expression), sometimes Hopa, a common Greek emotional expression
 Hematology/Oncology Pharmacy Association, a professional pharmacy association; see Joint Commission of Pharmacy Practitioners

People with the surname
Aaron Hopa (1971–1998), New Zealand rugby union player
Ngapare Hopa, Maori academic of Waikato Tainui descent
Thando Hopa (born 1989), South African model, activist, and lawyer

See also
OPA (disambiguation), including Opa